Ulotrichopus rama is a moth of the family Erebidae first described by Frederic Moore in 1885. It is found on Sumatra, Flores and Sri Lanka.

Description
The wingspan is about 66–72 mm. Mid tibia of male with a tuft of long hair arise from the base. Head and collar reddish, whereas thorax and abdomen greyish. Forewings grey with black irrorated. A short sub-basal line, an oblique antemedial waved black line can be seen. Reniform spot indistinct and pale with a fuscous patch on the costa above it. The postmedial line extremely irregularly dentate and highly angled beyond the cell. Hindwings are yellow with a curved medial black band which not reaching costa or inner margin. The outer are black with irregular inner edge and pale patched at apex and anal angle. Ventral side with a dark band and outer area of both wings are dark.

References

External links
Catocala of Asia

Moths described in 1885
Ulotrichopus
Moths of Asia